Star Ruler 2 is a hybrid real-time strategy and 4X video game developed and published by Blind Mind Studios.  It was released in 2015 and is the sequel to Star Ruler.  The game can still be bought via digital distribution, but Blind Mind released the game's source code in 2018 as open source.  This includes all the game's assets except the music.

Gameplay 
Star Ruler 2 blends elements of 4X and real-time strategy games.  The game is pausable but is real time.  Players control a space empire in galaxies that can include dozens of other empires, each comprising an alien species that can be customized.  The empires meet in a galactic senate, where players can expend influence to affect the game, such as annexing a competitor's territory.  Influence is built up over time and is spent using a card-based minigame.  Each empires is allocated a yearly budget.  Money not spent is redirected to research and social programs.  Resources are claimed by settling planets, and planets can form complex economic networks.  If the player develops their empire in such a way that it is dependent on a rare resource, losing the planet that provides that resource can cripple their empire.  Fleets are represented by flagships, which the player can move around the map.  The number of flagships is theoretically unlimited.  Space ships can be customized, and there is no limit to their size.

Reception 
PC Gamer included it in a list of the best 4X games for the PC, recommending it for players fond of large space battles.  Jonathan Bolding of The Escapist wrote, "Star Ruler 2 delivers a unique, fascinating experience despite its reliance on sometimes obtuse systems."  The game received a positive review from German site 4Players.

References

External links 
 

2015 video games
4X video games
Real-time strategy video games
Windows games
Linux games
Multiplayer and single-player video games
Indie video games
Open-source video games
Video games developed in the United States
Video game sequels
Video games using procedural generation